Ralph William Franklin (born January 3, 1947) was the eleventh Bishop of Western New York in the Episcopal Church between 2011 and 2019. He is Assisting Bishop of Long Island.

Biography 
Franklin was born in on January 3, 1947, in Brookhaven, Mississippi . He graduated with a B.A. from Northwestern University and a PhD in Church History from Harvard University. After ordination, Franklin served as Dean of Berkeley Divinity School at Yale and professor at General Theological Seminary and St John's in Minnesota. Franklin also served some time in Italy as associate priest at St Paul's Within the Walls in Rome, associate director of the American Academy in Rome, associate priest of the Anglican Centre in Rome and vicar of the Church of the Resurrection in Orvieto. He returned to the United States and was appointed senior associate priest at St Mark's Church in Philadelphia in July 2010. A few months later, on November 20, 2010, Franklin was elected Bishop of Western New York. He was consecrated on  April 30, 2011, by Presiding Bishop Katharine Jefferts Schori.

Franklin retired as Bishop of Western New York in April 2019.

References

1947 births
Living people
People from Brookhaven, Mississippi
Northwestern University alumni
Harvard Divinity School alumni
College of Saint Benedict and Saint John's University faculty
Episcopal bishops of Western New York